Count of Neiva (in Portuguese Conde de Neiva) is a Portuguese title granted, in 1373 by King Ferdinand I of Portugal, to Dom Gonçalo Teles de Meneses, brother of Queen Leonor Telles de Meneses.

Dom Gonçalo was also Lord of Faria, and that is why some authors, incorrectly, call him Count of Neiva and Faria.

Later, the County was granted to Fernando of Braganza and when Fernando became 2nd Duke of Braganza (1461), Count of Neiva became a subsidiary title of the House of Braganza.

List of the Counts of Ourém
Gonçalo Teles de Meneses ( ? -1403);
Fernando I, Duke of Braganza (1403-1478).

(for the list of holders after this date, see Duke of Braganza)

See also
Count of Barcelos
Duke of Braganza
House of Braganza
List of Portuguese Dukedoms
List of Countships in Portugal

External links
 Genealogy of the Counts of Neiva, in Portuguese

Bibliography
”Nobreza de Portugal e do Brasil” – Vol. III, page 47. Published by Zairol Lda., Lisbon 1989.

Countships of Portugal
1373 establishments in Europe
14th-century establishments in Portugal